Daniel Annesley was an English governor of the Bombay Presidency in the days of the Honourable East India Company. 

Annesley assumed the office on 10 May 1694 and left office on 17 May 1694.

References

Governors of Bombay
Year of birth unknown
Year of death unknown
17th-century English diplomats
17th-century English politicians